Woodmillar is a rural locality in the North Burnett Region, Queensland, Australia. In the  Woodmillar had a population of 116 people.

History 
Woodmillar State School opened on 15 November 1915 and closed on 1960.

In the  Woodmillar had a population of 116 people.

References 

North Burnett Region
Localities in Queensland